Vela 3B (also known Vela 6, Vela Hotel 6 and OPS 6564) was a U.S. reconnaissance satellite to detect explosions and nuclear tests on land and in space; the first of the third pair of Vela series satellites; taken together with Vela 3A and ERS 17 satellites.

The secondary task of the ship was space research (X-rays, gamma rays, neutrons, magnetic field and charged particles). 

The satellite was rotationally stabilized (2 rps). The ship could work in real time mode (one data frame per second) or in data recording mode (one frame every 256 seconds). The first mode was used for the first 40% of the mission's duration. About 1 transmission was received every 4 hours. The second mode was used until the next pair of Vela satellites were launched.

The ship remains in orbit around Earth.

Instruments
 X-ray and charged particle detector
 Gamma ray and charged particle detector
 Neutron detector
 X-ray scintillation counter
 Solid state detector
 Geiger-Muller counters
 Magnetometer
 Extreme Ultraviolet detector

See also 
 Vela (satellite)

References

External links 
 . Springer Nature
  (PDF). Springer Nature

1965 in spaceflight
Military space program of the United States
Derelict satellites orbiting Earth